Blue Clay Farms is an unincorporated community and census-designated place in New Hanover County, North Carolina, United States. Its population was 33 as of the 2010 census.

Geography

Demographics

References

Unincorporated communities in New Hanover County, North Carolina
Unincorporated communities in North Carolina
Census-designated places in New Hanover County, North Carolina
Census-designated places in North Carolina